Labidostomis longimana is a species of short-horned leaf beetles belonging to the family Chrysomelidae, subfamily Cryptocephalinae, tribe Clytrini.

Distribution
This species is found in most of Europe, in the eastern Palearctic realm, and in the Near East.

Description
These beetles are 4–7 mm long, the head and pronotum are black, the elytra are orange-brown.

Biology
The life cycle of these beetles lasts two years. They feed on cereals and several other plants. It is considered a pest of Pistachio (Pistacia vera).

References 

 A. O. Bienkowski - Larva of the leaf beetle Labidostomis longimana (Coleoptera, Chrysomelidae, Clytrinae) – Entomological Review – Volume 89, Number 3

External links

 Biolib
 Borowiec L.: Culex.biol.uni.wroc.pl Chrysomelidae of Europe 

Clytrini
Beetles of Europe
Beetles described in 1761
Taxa named by Carl Linnaeus